Parliamentary elections were held in the Kingdom of Dalmatia (then a region of the Austrian Empire and now part of Croatia and Montenegro) in 1864.  The Autonomists claimed their second in a run of three victories.

Results

Elections in Croatia
Dalmatia
1864 in Croatia
Elections in Austria-Hungary
History of Dalmatia
Election and referendum articles with incomplete results